Chante Charles Aznavour, vol. 3 is a 1955 album by Charles Aznavour. It was the third of three similarly titled 10" vinyl LPs for Ducretet-Thomson at the very beginning of the Charles Aznavour discography.

Track list
A1 Sur Ma Vie
A2 On Ne Sait Jamais
A3 Après L'amour
A4 Prends Garde
A5 Vivre Avec Toi
B1 J'aime Paris Au Mois De Mai
B2 Le Chemin De L'éternité
B3 J'entends Ta Voix
B4 Une Enfant
B5 Je Cherche Mon Amour

References

1956 albums
Charles Aznavour albums